Villa Santa Lucia is a comune (municipality) in the province of Frosinone in the Italian region Lazio, located about  southeast of Rome and about  southeast of Frosinone.   

Villa Santa Lucia borders the following municipalities: Cassino, Piedimonte San Germano, Pignataro Interamna, Terelle.

References

External links
 Official website

Cities and towns in Lazio